Lee Tae-ho (Hangul: 이태호, Hanja: 李泰昊, ; born January 29, 1961) is a former South Korean footballer who played as a forward. He spent his entire career playing for the Daewoo Royals. In the history of the FIFA World Cup, he was the first player to be blind in one eye.

International career
Before starting his professional career, he was the first South Korean to score at the FIFA World Youth Championship. His goal came against Canada at the 1979 tournament. Afterwards, he was called the "Korean Gerd Müller" for his scoring ability. He contributed to South Korea's gold medal at the 1986 Asian Games. His right eye was injured in 1987, but his blindness wasn't enough to stop his performance. He became the top goalscorer in the 1988 AFC Asian Cup and participated at the 1990 FIFA World Cup.

Career statistics

International
Results list South Korea's goal tally first.

Honours
Korea University
Korean National Championship runner-up: 1981
Korean President's Cup: 1982

Daewoo Royals
K League 1: 1984, 1987, 1991
Korean National Championship: 1989
Korean League Cup runner-up: 1986

South Korea U20
AFC Youth Championship: 1978

South Korea
Asian Games: 1986
AFC Asian Cup runner-up: 1980, 1988
Afro-Asian Cup of Nations: 1987

Individual
Korean FA Best XI: 1981, 1984, 1987, 1988
K League 1 Best XI: 1984, 1990
AFC Asian All Stars: 1985
AFC Asian Cup top goalscorer: 1988
AFC Asian Cup Best Forward: 1988
Korean National Championship Best Player: 1989
Korean National Championship top goalscorer: 1989

References

External links

1961 births
Living people
Sportspeople from Daejeon
Korea University alumni
South Korean footballers
Association football forwards
Busan IPark players
K League 1 players
South Korea under-20 international footballers
Olympic footballers of South Korea
South Korea international footballers
1980 AFC Asian Cup players
1984 AFC Asian Cup players
1986 FIFA World Cup players
Footballers at the 1986 Asian Games
1988 AFC Asian Cup players
Footballers at the 1988 Summer Olympics
1990 FIFA World Cup players
Asian Games medalists in football
Asian Games gold medalists for South Korea
Medalists at the 1986 Asian Games
South Korean football managers
Daejeon Hana Citizen FC managers
Chinese Taipei national football team managers
South Korean expatriate football managers
South Korean expatriate sportspeople in Taiwan
South Korean expatriate sportspeople in Nepal
Expatriate football managers in Taiwan
Expatriate football managers in Nepal